Terrence Anthony O'Mara (24 February 1941 – 13 August 1998) was an Australian rules footballer who played with Fitzroy in the Victorian Football League (VFL).

Notes

External links 		
		

1998 deaths
1941 births
Australian rules footballers from Victoria (Australia)
Fitzroy Football Club players
West Preston Football Club players